Gingerbread is a sweet that can take the form of a cake or cookie. This may also refer to:

Arts, entertainment, and media
 "Gingerbread" (Buffy the Vampire Slayer), an episode of the TV series Buffy the Vampire Slayer
 Gingerbread (Cohn novel), a 2002 novel by Rachel Cohn
 Gingerbread (Oyeyemi novel), a 2019 novel by Helen Oyeyemi
 "Ginger Bread" (song), a 1958 song by Frankie Avalon.

Science and technology
 Android Gingerbread, version 2.3 of the Android mobile operating system
 Gingerbread tree, or Hyphaene thebaica, a type of palm tree

Other uses
 Gingerbread (charity), a UK charity supporting single-parent families
 Gingerbread (architecture), a highly decorated Victorian architecture house

See also
 Gingerbread Man (disambiguation)